Oak Ridge Associated Universities (ORAU) is a consortium of American universities headquartered in Oak Ridge, Tennessee, with offices in Arlington, Virginia, Arvada, Colorado, Belcamp, Maryland, Cincinnati, Ohio and staff at other locations across the country.

History

The organization was first established in 1946 as the Oak Ridge Institute of Nuclear Studies (ORINS) with 14 university members.  Its original purpose was to advance science and technology education and research by providing access to the atomic energy research facilities of the Oak Ridge National Laboratory (ORNL) to faculty and students of universities across the South. The Institute also served to provide access to university faculty for ORNL researchers, arranging for University of Tennessee faculty to teach master's and doctoral courses in chemistry, math, and physics in Oak Ridge using ORNL facilities, equipment, and supplies.  University of Tennessee faculty member William G. Pollard developed the institution from a suggestion by ORNL physicist Katharine Way; Pollard would be elected the Institute's first executive director, a position he would hold until 1974. The name Oak Ridge Associated Universities was adopted in 1966.

In 1950, ORINS opened a hospital where it conducted clinical research for the United States Atomic Energy Commission on the use of radiation and radioactive materials in cancer treatment. The hospital treated patients until the mid-1970s. ORINS also conducted training courses in radioisotopes and established resident training programs in nuclear medicine. In the 1980s, clinical research at ORINS was the subject of investigation by the Advisory Committee on Human Radiation Experiments.

The Institute for Energy Analysis was organized as a unit of ORAU in January 1974, under the leadership of former Oak Ridge National Laboratory director Alvin Weinberg.  This institute's focus was evaluation of alternatives for meeting future energy requirements. From 1976 until it ceased operation with Weinberg's retirement in 1984, the Institute for Energy Analysis was a center for study of diverse issues related to carbon dioxide and global climate.

In the mid-1970s, ORAU operated the Training And Technology (TAT) Project, an effort at providing marketable technical skills to the disadvantaged unemployed. TAT taught basic sciences as well as technical skill concentrations, such as welding, machining, mechanical operations, drafting and physical testing. Employment search assistance was provided to trainees to integrate with regional industrial company opportunities.

The Radiation Emergency Assistance Center/Training Site (REAC/TS) was established by ORAU in 1976 to provide onsite emergency medical services, advice, and consultation for incidents involving radiation anywhere in the world.

Current mission and programs
ORAU's mission continues to be the advancement of scientific research and education. ORAU operates the Oak Ridge Institute for Science and Education (ORISE) under contract to the Department of Energy. ORISE provides operational capabilities and conducts research, education, and training in the areas of science and technology, national security, environmental safety and health, and environmental management.

Health physics and epidemiology continue to be major areas of activity for ORAU and ORISE. Activities include radiological surveys, dose reconstruction, and health screening for workers who may have been exposed to radioactive material, beryllium, or other toxins. The Radiation Emergency Assistance Center/Training Site (REAC/TS) continues to operate as a part of ORISE. A Cytogenetics Biodosimetry Laboratory has been established within ORISE to provide capabilities for measuring radiation dose and to conduct research to improve techniques for determining the doses received by victims of radiological accidents.

Members
ORAU defines two levels of membership, "sponsoring institution" and "associate member."  Sponsoring institutions must be non-profit, accredited universities granting doctoral degrees in relevant fields ("complementary to the interests of ORAU members and/or the programs of ORAU itself"), and either among the top schools in the US by Carnegie Classification or National Science Foundation research spending, or have offered doctoral degrees in multiple STEM fields for at least five years.  Associate members are not required to be non-profit, but must be accredited and offer graduate degrees in at least two science, engineering, or math fields; be recommended by an existing sponsoring institution or ORAU program; and receive a significant amount of NSF or other federal research funding.

The ORAU consortium comprises more than 120 sponsoring institutions and 19 associate members, as of November 2021.  Several institutions (28 as of November 2021) are additionally members of ORAU's Minority Serving Institutions (MSI) Research Council, created to foster "relationships between these schools" serving historically disadvantaged communities in the US "and some of the larger laboratories and research universities in America", and increase participation by members of minority communities in scientific research.

Sponsoring institutions

Associate members

See also
Advisory Committee on Human Radiation Experiments
Atoms for Peace
Oak Ridge Institute for Science and Education

Notes

References

External links
 Oak Ridge Associated Universities official website
 Oak Ridge Institute for Science and Education (ORISE) is managed by ORAU for the U.S. Department of Energy.

1946 establishments in Tennessee
Oak Ridge, Tennessee
International college and university associations and consortia
College and university associations and consortia in the United States
Educational institutions established in 1946